Richard Charles Patrick Hanifen (born June 15, 1931) is an American prelate of the Roman Catholic Church.  Hanifen was the first bishop of the new Diocese of Colorado Springs in Colorado, serving from 1984 to 2003. Hanifen served as an auxiliary bishop of the Archdiocese of Denver in Colorado from 1974 to 1984.

Biography

Early life and education 
Hanifen was born on June 15, 1931, in Denver, Colorado, the third of four children of Edward Anselm and Dorothy Elizabeth (née Ranous) Hanifen. Edward Anselm co-founded an investment firm in Denver. As a child, Hanifen suffered from chronic asthma.

Hanifen received his early education at the parochial school of St. Philomena Parish in Denver, where he occasionally served as an altar server. He attended Regis High School in Aurora, Colorado, while working as a delivery boy for a grocery store. After graduating from high school in 1949, Hanifen enrolled at Regis College in Denver. He earned a Bachelor of Science degree in accounting from Regis in 1953.

In 1953, Hanifen began his studies for the priesthood at St. Thomas Aquinas Seminary in Denver. During his studies, he was selected to participate in an experimental pairing between St. Thomas and the Catholic University of America in Washington, D.C. He later earned a Bachelor of Sacred Theology degree from Catholic University in 1959.

Priesthood 
On June 6, 1959, Hanifen was ordained a priest by Archbishop Urban J. Vehr at the Cathedral of the Immaculate Conception in Denver Hanifen's first assignment after ordination was as an assistant pastor at Our Lady of the Mountains Parish in Estes Park, Colorado. He then served at the Cathedral of the Immaculate Conception Parish.  In 1966, Hanifen entered Catholic University of America, earning a Master of Arts degree in guidance and counseling.

In 1968, Hanifen received a Licentiate of Canon Law from the Pontifical Lateran University in Rome. During his time in Italy, he and some of his fellow students visited Florence, experiencing the 1966 flood of the River Arno. Following his return to Denver in 1968, Hanifen served as vice-chancellor of the archdiocese and secretary to Archbishop James V. Casey. In 1969, he was appointed as chancellor of the archdiocese.

Auxiliary Bishop of Denver 
On July 6, 1974, Pope Paul VI appointed Hanifen as an auxiliary bishop of the Diocese of Denver and titular bishop of Abercornia. He was consecrated on September 20, 1974 by Archbishop Casey, with Bishops George R. Evans and Charles A. Buswell serving as co-consecrators. As an auxiliary bishop, Hanifen was appointed as episcopal vicar for the southern area of the archdiocese in 1975. Hanifen was in Rome for a one-month study sabbatical when Pope John Paul I was elected in the papal conclave of August 1978; Hanifen participated in the new pope's Inauguration Mass on September 3, 1978.

Bishop of Colorado Springs
On November 10, 1983, Pope John Paul II appointed Hanifen as the first bishop of the newly created Diocese of Colorado Springs.  In January 1984, he told The Colorado Springs Gazette:, "A bishop should not be a glaring watch dog of orthodoxy but a good shepherd of his flock." Hanifen was installed at the Pikes Peak Center in Colorado Springs on January 30, 1984.

in September 1984, Hanifen designated St. Mary's Church in Colorado, Springs as the diocesan cathedral and launched The Catholic Herald, the monthly diocesan newspaper. He emphasized collaboration with the laity, appointing them to leadership positions within the diocese to ease the burden of the clergy. He also supported ecumenism and interfaith dialogue, co-founding the Center for Christian-Jewish Dialogue in Colorado Springs with Rabbi Howard Hirsch. During Hanifen's nearly two decades as bishop, the number of Catholics and parishes in the diocese nearly doubled.

Retirement 
On January 30, 2003, Hanifen sent his letter of resignation as Bishop of the Diocese of Colorado Springs to John Paul II. The pope appointed Bishop Michael Sheridan as his replacement. After retirement, Hanifen continued to provide counseling to parishioners, hold retreats, and assist with confirmations and other major masses.

See also
 

 Catholic Church hierarchy
 Catholic Church in the United States
 Historical list of the Catholic bishops of the United States
 List of Catholic bishops of the United States
 Lists of patriarchs, archbishops, and bishops

References

External links
 Roman Catholic Diocese of Colorado Springs Official Site

Episcopal succession

1931 births
Living people
People from Denver
Roman Catholic Archdiocese of Denver
Roman Catholic bishops of Colorado Springs
20th-century Roman Catholic bishops in the United States
Regis University alumni
Catholic University of America alumni
21st-century Roman Catholic bishops in the United States